Banggai may refer to various locations in Indonesia:- 

 Banggai Regency, a regency of Central Sulawesi in Indonesia
 Banggai Islands Regency, a separate regency cut out of the Banggai Regency
 Banggai Laut Regency, a regency of Central Sulawesi in Indonesia
 Banggai Island, an island in Indonesia
 Kingdom of Banggai, a small former state in the regions above